Tai Om Shan (Cantonese Yale: daaih ām shāan) is a village in Lam Tsuen, Tai Po District, Hong Kong.

Recognised status
Tai Om Shan is a recognised village under the New Territories Small House Policy.

History
At the time of the 1911 census, the population of Tai Om Shan was 72. The number of males was 30.

References

External links

 Delineation of area of existing village Tai Om Shan (Tai Po) for election of resident representative (2019 to 2022)

Villages in Tai Po District, Hong Kong
Lam Tsuen